David Spindler is an independent American scholar and researcher on the Great Wall of China. Writing in The New Yorker in 2007, Peter Hessler called him " a leading expert on the Wall’s history and construction."   He attended Dartmouth College and Harvard Law School, studied as a graduate student at Peking University, and spent two years as a consultant at McKinsey & Company.

Notes

External links

David Spindler's Great Wall
David Spindler - The Great Wall NBC Today video interview on David Spindler
Great Wall Photographs and Driftwood Sculptures Inspired by Chinese Scholars Rocks Comprise Inaugural Exhibition
China: Wall Scholar BY Joe Rubin Frontline video interview with David Spindler. September 17, 2009
长城小站
China's Great Wall: The Forgotten Story  USCI
Inside the Great Wall of China: Facts part 1 Discovery channel video
Inside the Great Wall of China: Facts part 2 Discovery channel video
Inside the Great Wall of China: Facts part 3 Discovery channel video
Inside the Great Wall of China: Facts part 4 Discovery channel video
Inside the Great Wall of China: Facts part 5 Discovery channel video

Great Wall of China
American sinologists
Dartmouth College alumni
Harvard Law School alumni
Year of birth missing (living people)
Living people